The Indian Under-19 cricket team represents the nation of India in cricket at Under-19 level. The team has won five Under-19 World Cups and has the best win percentage in ODIs (77%) among all Under-19 national teams.

The team has won the Under-19 World Cup five times and finished runners-up thrice. In 2000, they won it under the captaincy of Mohammad Kaif, in 2008, they won it under Virat Kohli's leadership, in 2012 under Unmukt Chand, in 2018 under Prithvi Shaw, and in 2022 under Yash Dhull.

The team is currently captained by Yash Dhull and coached by former India cricketer Hrishikesh Kanitkar.

ICC Under-19 Cricket World Cup record

ACC Under-19 Asia Cup record

Honours

ICC
U-19 World Cup:
 Champions (5): 2000, 2008, 2012, 2018, 2022
 Runners-up (3): 2006, 2016, 2020

ACC
U-19 Asia Cup:
 Champions (8): 1989, 2003, 2012, 2013-14, 2016, 2018, 2019, 2021

Records and Statistics

International match summary – India Under-19s

Youth Test record versus other nations

Youth ODI record versus other nations

Current squad
Players who were selected for the 2022 Under-19 Cricket World Cup:

 Yash Dhull (c)
 Shaik Rasheed (vc)
 Dinesh Bana (wk)
 Raj Angad Bawa
 Aneeshwar Gautam
 Rajvardhan Hangargekar
 Vicky Ostwal
 Manav Parakh
 Angkrish Raghuvanshi
 Ravikumar
 Garv Sangwan
 Nishant Sindhu
 Harnoor Singh
 Kaushal Tambe
 Vasu Vats
 Aaradya Yadav (wk)
 Siddarth Yadav
Reserve Players: Rishit Reddy, Uday Saharan, Ansh Gosai, Amrit Raj Upadhyay and PM Singh Rathore

Support staff
 Head coach and batting coach: Hrishikesh Kanitkar
 Bowling coach: Sairaj Bahutule
 Fielding coach: Munish Bali

See also
India men's national cricket team
India women's national cricket team
India women's national under-19 cricket team

References

1979 establishments in India
Under-19 cricket teams
Under19
Cricket
Cricket clubs established in 1979